The 1981 Kilkenny Senior Hurling Championship was the 87th staging of the Kilkenny Senior Hurling Championship since its establishment by the Kilkenny County Board.

Ballyhale Shamrocks were the defending champions.

James Stephens won the championship after a 2-10 to 0-08 defeat of Fenians in the final. It was their sixth championship title overall and their first title in five championship seasons.

References

Kilkenny Senior Hurling Championship
Kilkenny Senior Hurling Championship